Punnapra Vayalar is a 1968 Indian Malayalam-language film, directed and produced by Kunchacko. The film stars Prem Nazir, Sheela, Adoor Bhasi and P. J. Antony in the lead roles. The film had musical score by K. Raghavan.

Cast 

Prem Nazir as Prabhakaran
Sheela as Chelamma
Adoor Bhasi as Gopalji
P. J. Antony as Kochu Naanu
Thikkurussi Sukumaran Nair as Maariyaveedan
N. Govindankutty as Achuthan
Sharada as Malathi
Bahadoor as Paappi Mooppan
Kalaikkal Kumaran as Basheer
Khadeeja as Mariya
Kottarakkara Sreedharan Nair as Neelakandan
S. P. Pillai as Ouseph
Ushakumari as Chinnamma
Vanakkutty as Vaasu
Kaduvakulam Antony as Velayudhan
Adoor Pankajam as PK Vilasiniyamma
Manavalan Joseph as Kandarkunju
G. K. Pilla as SI Rajan
Pankajavalli as Prabhakaran's mother

Soundtrack 
The music was composed by K. Raghavan and the lyrics were written by Vayalar Ramavarma and P. Bhaskaran.

References

External links 
 

1968 films
1960s Malayalam-language films
Films shot in Alappuzha